The 1991–92 Southwestern Louisiana Ragin' Cajuns men's basketball team represented the University of Southwestern Louisiana as a member of the Sun Belt Conference during the 1991–92 NCAA Division I men's basketball season. The Ragin' Cajuns, led by 6th-year head coach Marty Fletcher, played their home games at Cajundome in Lafayette, Louisiana. The team finished atop the conference regular season standings, and followed that success by winning the Sun Belt tournament to earn an automatic bid to the NCAA tournament. As the No. 13 seed in the West region, SW Louisiana defeated Oklahoma in the opening round, 87–83 before losing to New Mexico State in the second round, 81–73.

Roster

Schedule and results

|-
!colspan=9 style=| Non-conference regular season

|-
!colspan=9 style=| Sun Belt regular season

|-
!colspan=9 style=| Sun Belt tournament

|-
!colspan=9 style=| NCAA tournament

Source

References

Louisiana Ragin' Cajuns men's basketball seasons
Southwestern Louisiana
Southwestern Louisiana